Smithian may refer to:

Smithian (regional geological stage), a regional geological stage of the Early Triassic epoch (249.7 – 247.4 Ma) preceded by the Dienerian and followed by the Spathian
Smithian, pertaining to, or characteristic of Adam Smith (1723–1790), Scottish philosopher and pioneer of political economy
Smithian, something of, pertaining to, or characteristic of a person bearing the surname Smith